Padenia moluccensis is a moth of the subfamily Arctiinae. It was described by van Eecke in 1920. It is found on the Moluccas.

References

Lithosiini
Moths described in 1920